The Sorrowful Shore is a 1913 American drama film directed by  D. W. Griffith.

Cast
 Harry Carey as The Widowed Father
 W. Christy Cabanne as The Son
 Olive Carey as The Orphan (as Olive Fuller Golden)
 Frank Opperman as The Orphan's Father
 Robert Harron as One of the Son's Friends
 William Courtright as On Shore
 J. Jiquel Lanoe as On Shore
 Jennie Lee as On Shore
 Adolph Lestina as On Shore
 Mae Marsh as On Shore

See also
 Harry Carey filmography
 D. W. Griffith filmography

References

External links

1913 films
1913 drama films
1913 short films
American silent short films
American black-and-white films
Silent American drama films
Films directed by D. W. Griffith
1910s American films